The ICD Freestyle (abbreviated FS) is an electropneumatic paintball gun, or marker, made by Indian Creek Designs of Nampa, Idaho. Except for the air line, it is built completely of precision-machined aluminum.

The current model is the FS8. It features a clamping feedneck, four-point adjustable trigger, multiple firing modes, and an autococker-threaded barrel. Previous versions include the FS7 and a series of "Freestyle" models, each with a year designation.

Operation
The FS uses a spool system similar to an Automag, but instead of incorporating a shut-off valve, and using a sear/spring arrangement to return the bolt from its blow-forward operation, it uses air pressure. The system has full-pressure supply air stored in a dump chamber in the rear of the marker. This pressure is applied to the center pin in the rear of the bolt, which is biased to push it open. The regulated air supplied by a front Low Pressure Regulator (LPR) is run through a 2/3-way solenoid valve that is designed to be "Normally On" when it is not energized. This lower pressure air is supplied to the front of the bolt, and the regulator is adjusted to supply enough force to push the bolt back against the supply pressure.

When the solenoid valve is energized the air in front of the bolt vents, allowing the bias supplied to the rear of the bolt to move it forward. When the bolt has moved forward enough to seal the breech, the pin unseals from the powertube it rides in, and air is vented through the bolt to the ball, firing it. When the solenoid valve is de-energized, air is again supplied to the front of the bolt to return it.

Here is an animation of inside the 2004 generation one freestyle. The red indicates the flow of high pressure air. The yellow shows where the low pressure air is used in the bolt assembly.

External links
Product page
Indian Creek Designs Owners Group

Paintball markers